Ohr ("Light" ; plural: Ohros/Ohrot "Lights" ) is a central Kabbalistic term in Jewish mysticism. The analogy of physical light is used as a way of describing metaphysical divine emanations. Shefa ( "flow" and its derivative, Hashpoah "Influence" ) is sometimes alternatively used in Kabbalah, a term also used in Medieval Jewish philosophy to mean divine influence, while the Kabbalists favour Ohr because its numerical value equals Raz ("mystery"). It is one of the two main metaphors in Kabbalah for understanding God, along with the other metaphor of the human soul-body relationship for the sefirot. 

The metaphorical description of spiritual divine creative flow, using the term for physical "light" perceived with the eye, arises from analogous similarities. These include the intangible physicality of light, the delight it inspires and the illumination it gives, its apparently immediate transmission and constant connection with its source. Light can be veiled ("tzimtzum"-constrictions in Kabbalah) and reflected ("an ascending light from the Creations" in Kabbalah). White light divides into seven colours, yet this plurality unites from one source. Divine light divides into the seven emotional sefirot, but there is no plurality in the Divine essence. The term Ohr in Kabbalah is contrasted with ma'ohr, the "luminary", and kli, the spiritual "vessel" for the light.

As a metaphor it also has its limitations. Divinity can only be understood from analogous comparisons to the spatial and temporal phenomena we understand. Once these images are grasped, Kabbalah stresses the need to then attempt to transcend them by understanding their deficiencies. Among the limitations of the central metaphor of "light" are the physical inability of the luminary to withhold its radiance, the fulfilment of purpose the light gives the luminary, and the categorical differentiation between the source and its light. For God, the Creation metaphorically "arose in the Divine Will" and was not impelled. The emanation of Creation fills no lack in the perfection of God. The distinction between the Divine light (beginning with the Ohr Ein Sof - the primordial "Infinite Light", and subsequently the ten sefirot emanations) and the Divine Ein Sof or divine source appears only relative to Creation. From God's perspective, Scripture states "For I, the Eternal, I have not changed". From the perspective of God's self-knowledge, the emanations remain completely united and nullified to their source. This answers early Rabbinic criticism of dualism in Kabbalah. The term in Kabbalah and Hasidic philosophy for this nullification is bittul. In devekut or daily spiritual life, it inspires the mystical humility of nullification of the ego.

The Ohr Ein Sof - The Infinite Light

The Ein Sof (literally: "Without End"/Limitless/Infinite) is the Kabbalistic term for the Divine essence. Kabbalah describes 10 Sephirot (The 10 Divine emanations or attributes), that reveal the unknowable Godhead to the creations and channel the creative life-force to all levels of existence. However, these 10 attributes of God do not represent the Divine essence. The Kabbalists differentiated between the manifestations of God (forms of "light"), and their origin in the Divine essence (the "Luminary"). This difference overcame the criticism that they were introducing plurality into the pure Monotheism of Judaism. Kabbalistic texts take great care to emphasise this difference, and warn against anthropomorphising the subtle descriptions of Kabbalah in human terms. To avoid such heresies, the historical transmission of Kabbalah was traditionally restricted to direct teaching in close circles.

As well as the 10 "lights" of God encapsulated in the Sephirot, Kabbalah also describes a more primordial light that shines from the Ein Sof (Infinite) itself. This light, the origin of all Creation, and all lower lights, is called the "Ohr Ein Sof" ("The light of the Infinite", or alternatively, itself "The Infinite Light"). The Kabbalistic and Hasidic masters ask the question of how there can be a revelation of God, in the Ohr Ein Sof, before Creation. Surely, there can be "no king without a people". Before Creation, there could be no being to behold a revelation of Divine light. The Ohr Ein Sof is a form of Divine self-knowledge, and through God knowing Himself, He created everything, with its subsequent historical unfolding, and its ultimate purpose in the innermost Divine Will.

Tzimtzum – Restrictions of Divine Light

As the Ohr Ein Sof is itself infinite, it could not itself directly be the source for the creation of Worlds (Four Worlds and Seder hishtalshelus). Any direct creations of the Infinite Light would be of infinite number, and would not be actual creations at all, as they would remain totally nullified ("bittul") to the Infinite Light, and would have no independent self-awareness. Rather it is only through the restrictions of the Sephirot and the descending "Chain of Progression" (Seder hishtalshelus), that the Worlds could unfold. In the descending chain of Worlds from the Infinite to our finite realm, the creative flow of Divine light encapsulated in the Sephirot, undergoes countless restrictions, diminutions and veilings, to progressively hide Divinity. In Kabbalah these are called "Tzimtzum" ("Constrictions" - plural "tzimtzumim").

However, after the new teachings and doctrines of Isaac Luria (The "Arizal"), in Lurianic Kabbalah, these innumerable Tzimtzumim of the descending chain of Worlds are called the "Second Tzimtzum". Isaac Luria taught the new concept of a "First Tzimtzum", based on earlier allusions in the Zohar. As Lurianic Kabbalah became almost universally accepted in the Jewish development of Kabbalah, nowadays if the term Tzimtzum is used without qualification, it will invariably refer to the first, cosmic, ultimate Constriction taught by Luria (see Tzimtzum).

In this radical concept of the "Ari", at the beginning of Creation the Divine "withdrew" (a complete tzimtzum) from a "Chalal" ("Vacated space"), to allow Creation to take place. The interpretation of this forms a central concern of subsequent Kabbalah (see Tzimtzum), and the "withdrawal" of God is interpreted only as a concealment from the perspective of the Creation, and only to apply to His light, not His Essence, as that would imply heretical limitations to the Divine. In Lurianic Kabbalah, the Tzimtzum concealed the Ohr Ein Sof, which resolved the dichotomy between the Infinite Light and the possibility of creating finite Worlds. Without this radical leap of a concealment of the Ohr Ein Sof, even with the progressive, gradual concealments of the Chain of Worlds, the problem would not properly be overcome. Only a second, new light, immeasurably diminished, and of a different quality than the Ohr Ein Sof, could become the creative source of all reality. This new light, a "thin" illumination from the Ohr Ein Sof, called the "Kav" ("Ray"), shone into the "Vacated Space", and was a light that was adapted to the perspective of the subsequent creations on their own terms. It could relate to finite creation (Divine immanence), rather than the infinite Primordial light (the ultimate Divine transcendence).

Interpretations of this in Kabbalah and Hasidic philosophy, are careful to avoid literal, spatial, geometric understandings of the Vacated Space and the Kav, as such dimensional understandings relate only to our physical world. Nonetheless, circular diagram representations of this, strictly metaphorical, are used in Kabbalah to represent the process. In the first, a black circle is broken only by one thin, vertical, straight line that descends from the surrounding white into the centre of the black circle from the top. Here the surrounding white represents the Ein Sof, the black circle represents the Chalal vacated "space", and the thin white line represents the "thin" illumination of the Kav, derived from the Ohr Ein Sof, but able to illuminate into the Chalal on its own terms.

This representation is then augmented by a second, similar diagram, where the successive, unfolding Five Worlds, each with 10 successive Sephirot, are shown within the original circle as a series of concentric circles. The descending chain of Worlds proceeds in the diagram towards the centre of the circle, representing our lowest, physical realm. Each successive World and Sephirah is a successively smaller concentric circle, representing diminished, more constricted Divinity. The same Kav line is still shown connecting the outer Ein Sof to the centre of the circle, as the light of the Kav is the origin of all Creation after the Tzimtzum, though its light undergoes innumerable second tzimtzumim, toward the circle's centre. The utilisation here of concentric circles, or spheres is also significant, as with each subsequent lower step, the light encompasses" (sovev - "surrounds") that level of "immanent" (mimalei"-"filled") creation. Each of the Sephirot comprises both an encompassing light vested in its immanent vessel. Each World similarly incorporates its own relative level of Divine transcendence, illuminating its own level of Divine immanence.

In the 10 Sefirot: Ohrot and Keilim - Lights and Vessels

The 10 Sephirot describe the emanations, or attributes of God in Kabbalah. The Ein Sof ("Limitless") is the unknowable, undifferentiated, infinite Divine essence. The 10 emanations of the Sephirot enable the Creation to know God, and become God's attributes that reveal Divinity. They are also the channels through which all of Creation is continuously substained from nothing, as in the Kabbalistic scheme, Creation is continuous and God is the only true existence. A "Chain of Progression" (Seder hishtalshelus) of descending "Worlds", including the Four Worlds, links the Ein Sof with our physical realm.

Each of the Sephirot is said to consist of a "light" (an ohr) that is vested in a "vessel" (a kli ; plural: keilim ). Generally speaking, the light is simple and undifferentiated, as it stems originally from the Ohr Ein Sof ("The Light of the Ein Sof"), God's infinite light. It represents Divine revelation in the world. It is associated with the Kabbalistic Divine Name of Ban. The differentiation between the 10 Sephirot, each with its own particular characteristic, arises from each of their different spiritual vessels. The light adapts itself to each vessel, to express the particular nature of each vessel.

Kabbalists read their mystical teachings into exegetical interpretations of Scripture and Rabbinic literature. This arose from their belief that Kabbalah forms part of the Oral Torah inherent in the revelation at Mount Sinai. Accordingly, in Jewish tradition, each verse and concept can be interpreted in the fourfold Jewish method of Pardes, with the metaphysical interpretations of Kabbalah and Hasidic philosophy forming the Sod (secret) level of meaning. In this way, Kabbalah interprets a second meaning in Talmudic legislation and use of the term for "vessel" ("kli"). In the Halachic sense a vessel is an object that can serve a useful purpose, even if it may not resemble a physical receptacle. This term is used frequently in discussion of the laws of Shabbat. In Jewish mysticism, typically, these narratives are given metaphysical interpretations, which relate "kli" to its Kabbalistic meaning. In Hasidic philosophy, the plural fourfold levels of meaning are viewed as uniting in a higher essential source of explanation that describes Divinity. Jewish mysticism views such alternative, spiritual interpretations of Torah as stemming from more revealed Divine realms in the Chain of Worlds.

Bittul - Nullification of emanations and Creations in the Divine light

Ratzo and Shuv - Run and Return of emanations and Creations

More generally, Ohr also refers to the revelation and expression of any particular spiritual level which descends from that level and enclothes itself in a vessel (Kli). This Ohr is typically in a state of "Bittul" ("nullification") vis-a-vis the level from which it stems. Therefore, even when it descends to lower realms, it possesses a characteristic of "Ratzo" ("Run"), the desire to ascend and return to its source. Correspondingly, the Kli persuades the Ohr to descend through impressing upon it the need for Shuv ("Return"), the acknowledgment of the necessity of descent in order to fulfill the ultimate supernal will.

The purpose of Creation was not for the sake of the higher spiritual Worlds. In relation to the infinite Ein Sof, their great revelations of Divinity are a concealment, and have no comparison. Instead, the ultimate purpose of Creation in Kabbalah is for the sake of the lowest World, our physical realm. The Divine Will was to have a dwelling place in this World, made by man, which will be achieved in the Messianic Age. In higher spiritual Worlds (Seder hishtalshelus), the souls and angels sense this, and seek to channel Divine flow down the chain of Worlds. Therefore, Shuv, even though it is an exile for the light to descend into the vessel, is the ultimate purpose of Creation. The terms "Ratzo" and "Shuv" come from the Biblical description of the angels in the vision of Ezekiel (1:4-26), when he beheld the Divine chariot (Merkavah). These angels "ran and returned". In this explanation, they desired to ascend to God, but returned down to their station, to fulfil their purpose. In daily spiritual life too, man seeks dveikus (cleaving) with God, and then returns with this inspiration to fulfil his or her tasks in the World. Here the human soul is the "ohr", the body the "kli", and this realm presently an exile for the soul.

The dynamics of Ratzo and Shuv are felt by the angels and man, but also apply to any spiritual emanation. The "Seder Histalshelus" describes the continuous descending chain from the Infinite to our finite World. In each World, the 10 Sephirot shine. Each World unfolds from the previous, with the lowest Sephirah (Malchut-"Kingship"-fulfilment of the plan in reality) of one World, becoming the highest Sephirah (Keter-"Crown"-the supernal Will of the plan in that World) of the next, lower World. Within each World too, the spiritual chain descends down the 10 Sephirot, with the illumination of one giving birth to the next, lower Sephirah.

Ohr and Ma'ohr - Two levels of Nullification of the Light to the Luminary
The "Ohr" ("Light") stems from the "Ma'ohr" ("Luminary"), the source of the light. Traditionally, the Mashal (parable) given to explain this relationship, is the relationship between the sun and the light that it gives off. However, technically speaking, the light that comes from the sun is not the perfect example for the Ohr, since it has already passed through a "Nartik" ("Sheath/Shield"), a level that reduces the intensity of the revelation of the sun. In truth, the Ohr that exists in the parable of the sun is the light of the sun that exists in the sun itself. The light that we see from the sun has already been limited in its quality and therefore lacks the "Bittul" ("nullification") of the true Ohr to its origin. Rather, this Ohr, being that it has been limited by the Nartik, is called Ohr HaNartik (the light of the sheath), for although it does not actually come from the Nartik, since the Nartik limited it in such a way that it no longer possesses a connection with its ultimate source, we associate it with the Nartik.

In Kabbalah, the level of the Ma'ohr is represented by the higher Hebrew name of God, the Tetragrammaton, and the Ohr is the revelation of that level. Similarly, the lower name of God, Elokim (Here the "h" has been replaced with a "k" in traditional deference to avoid writing the names of God), represents the Nartik, and the light that stems thereof is the Ohr HaNartik, and as such, it lacks a higher level of nullification, enabling it to create the Worlds. If the light of the Tetragrammaton were to create the Worlds, they would not exist as creations with independent self-awareness. The immense revelation of the Divine would nullify them in their source, as the light of the sun inside the sun itself.

In the second section of the Tanya by Schneur Zalman of Liadi, the Hasidic Panentheism of the Baal Shem Tov, the founder of Hasidism, is systematically explained in philosophical terms. Two levels of Divine Unity are explained, that paradoxically are both true perspectives. From God's perspective, in comparison to the unchanging Divine Infinity, all of Creation is literally as if it did not exist (Acosmism). This is represented by a Higher Bittul-"Bittul Hametsiyas" ("Nullification of Essence") of the light of the sun inside the orb of the sun itself. This is called the "Upper Divine Unity". The "Lower Divine Unity" describes the Unity of God from the illusory self independent perspective of the Creations. From this perspective, Creation does exist, but is continuously dependent on receiving its Divine lifeforce that constantly brings it into being from nothing. In our World, this constant, total dependence for the existence of everything on the Divine creative light is hidden. In the spiritual Worlds of Creation, it is revealed, but they still lack true "Bittul" (nullification), as the souls and angels in those realms have some self-awareness, albeit totally nullified to God. This Lower Bittul-"Bittul Hayesh" ("Nullification of Ego") is represented by a light of a candle on a sunny day. In the Chain of Four Worlds, the first realm, the World of Atzilus, is not yet considered a Creation, but rather an emanation of supernal Divinity. It is characterised by the higher Nullification of Essence. The three lower realms of Beriah, Yetzirah and Asiyah are considered created realms as they only possess different levels of the lower Nullification of Ego.

This explanation of the spiritual meanings of the different Hebrew names of God of the Tetragrammaton and Elokim, gives the Kabbalistic reason why the lower name "Elokim" (Divine immanence) is universally used in the Creation account in the beginning of Genesis, with the multiple phrases on each day:
"And God (Elokim) said, 'Let there be..'"
In Kabbalah, going back to the Scriptural commentary of Nachmanides, the 7 Days of Creation are understood to symbolically refer to the 7 Emotional revelations of the Sefirot, each one called a "day". These Hebrew sayings themselves, are explained in Kabbalah to be the creative channels of the Sephirot in activating Creation. Only after Genesis recounts its first narrative of Creation, with the beginning of its second account, does it use the higher, essential, Divine name of the Tetragrammaton (Divine transcendence). Here it combines both names, as both are involved in Creation. Later on, when God speaks to Moses, the name of God used is only the transcendent Tetragrammaton. In the second account of Creation:
"This is the account of the Heavens and the Earth when they were created, when the Lord (Tetragrammaton) God (Elokim) made the Earth and Heavens."
According to the Kabbalistic and Hasidic explanation, the ability to Create Ex nihilo (something from nothing) can only come from the Divine essence (Ein Sof), which is referred to by the Tetragrammaton. Nonetheless, the light to create existence must be constricted through the name Elokim. This process is referred to in this second account of Creation.

Sovev/Makif and Mimalei/Pnimi - Surrounding/Transcendent light and Filling/Inner light

Sovev means "surrounding" and Mimalei means "filling". The geometric associations of these adjectives are metaphorical. Kabbalah describes two types of light that emanate in Creation. One, called "Sovev Kol Olmin" ("Surrounding All Worlds"), is the Divine light of transcendence, rooted in the Ohr Ein Sof (primordial "Infinite Light") before the Tzimtzum of Lurianic Kabbalah. It descends through the Seder hishtalshelut (Chain of Worlds), representing Divine transcendence in each level. It could be revealed in a blessing or miracle above the vessels and limitations of that realm. Souls in their essence transcend the body and all the Worlds. Similarly, as the Zohar states that God is totally united with his Torah, the Torah is inherently transcendent in all Worlds, and each World studies it according to their mystical level of perception.

The other light, called Mimalei Kol Olmin ("Filling All Worlds") is the Divine light of immanence, rooted in the Kav (first "Ray" of light) after the Tzimtzum in Lurianic Kabbalah. This is the light that descends immanently to every level of the Chain of Worlds, itself creating every spiritual and, ultimately, physical vessel of each World. It undergoes the innumerable concealments and contractions of the second Tzimtzumim. Hasidic thought sees the ultimate advantage of this lower light, because the ultimate purpose of Creation lies in this lowest realm. Hasidism therefore rejected Jewish asceticism, seeking to utilise and mystically transform the physical into spirituality, through dveikus cleaving to God. Hasidic thought likewise describes another, higher type of miracle that is immanently invested within the physical laws of this World, without breaking them. Only a higher source rooted in the Divine essence, beyond infinite-finite duality, could unite the infinite encompassing light of Sovev within the limited invested light of Mimalei.

These terms are equivalent to the parallel notions of Makif ("Outer") and Pnimi ("Inner"), taught in Hasidic philosophy. In the words of the Alter Rebbe:

Hasidism relates the esoteric spiritual structures of Kabbalah to their inner dimensions in the consciousness and perception of man. This is found in the Hasidic idea of dveikus (mystical fervour). It seeks an inner response to the Jewish mystical tradition. In the Sephirot, for example, Hasidic thought focuses on the inner motivational soul within each Sephirah, and its parallel in the spiritual psychology of man.

Direct/descending light and reflected/ascending light
A descending light is a Divine emanation "from above". It is metaphorically called "masculine waters" and "an arousal from Above" in Kabbalah, based on the verses in Genesis 1:6-8 about the Upper and Lower Waters:
6 And God said, Let there be a firmament in the midst of the waters, and let it divide the waters from the waters. 7 And God made the firmament, and divided the waters which were under the firmament from the waters which were above the firmament: and it was so. 8 And God called the firmament Heaven. And the evening and the morning were the second day.
The descent of masculine waters can be a free expression of the Sephirah of Hesed (Kindness), which has the essential nature to give Divine blessing in an unlimited way, without considering whether the vessels of the Creation are worthy. Hesed is counterbalanced by Gevurah (Judgement), that measures and withholds the blessing according to the worth and capacity of the vessel.

More commonly, the descent of direct light is in response to the ascent from below of reflected light. This "arousal from below", the ascent of "feminine waters", is the spiritual illumination created by each person through meritorious ethical or ritual mitzvot (Jewish observances). While Kabbalah offered radical theosophical cosmic explanations of Judaism, it remained inherently conservative. The metaphysical doctrines of Kabbalah support and deepen normative Jewish observance. Kabbalah, especially the new teachings of Isaac Luria in the 16th Century, taught the cosmic power of each person to affect and rectify the Divine scheme of Creation. In Lurianic Kabbalah, the ultimate Tikkun is dependent on each individual fulfilling their own unique tasks in Creation, through the mitzvot. This affect would occur whether the person was aware of the deeper meanings or not. The great delight the illumination of the ascending feminine waters causes in the Heavenly realms (Four Worlds), leads to the reciprocal Divine response of descending blessing and light in the Masculine waters. This gives the inherent metaphysical Kabbalistic structure of the traditional Jewish belief of "Reward and Punishment", incorporated in Maimonides' Jewish Principles of Faith. The Kabbalistic explanation puts these external categories in an inner scheme of Divine loving-kindness.

An example given in Kabbalah of the dynamics of "masculine" and "feminine" waters, is found in the yartzheit (date of passing) and birthdays of three central figures in the Jewish mystical tradition. Judah Loew ben Bezalel (the Maharal) died on the 18th day (18 means "Chai"-"life" in Gematria) of the Hebrew month of Elul in the year 1609 (17 September). The 18th of Elul, 12 days before Rosh Hashanah, is a central mystical date in the personal preparations of teshuvah (return to God) for the upcoming "Days of Awe". A central component of the teachings of the Maharal was the concept of Divine paradox, above intellect. This prepared the way for the Hasidic movement, that sought the inner expression in Hasidic philosophy of the Kabbalistic tradition. The founder of Hasidism, Israel Baal Shem Tov was born on the 18th of Elul in 1698 (August 27), and the founder of Habad intellectual expression of Hasidism, Schneur Zalman of Liadi, was born on the 18th day of Elul in 1745 (September 4). Kabbalah teaches that the yarthzeit of a Tzaddik (righteous person) causes the spiritual revelation and ascent of their life's spiritual service, the ascent of the "feminine waters" the Tzaddik illuminated. Anyone who attaches themselves to the teachings and influence of the Tzaddik receives from their illumination and blessing on the yartzheit. In the Kabbalistic scheme, this "arousal from below" elicited the "arousal of God from above" to descend "masculine waters" by the descent of the souls on this date, later on, of the Baal Shem Tov and Schneur Zalman of Liadi. Kabbalah finds an allusion to the deeper aspects of this structure, including the essence of the different spiritual teachings of these three figures, in a Scriptural verse that relates to the mystical meaning of the 18th of Elul.

Photo gallery

See also

Notes

Jewish theology
Kabbalah
Sephirot
Hebrew words and phrases
Kabbalistic words and phrases
Light and religion